Marta Bērzkalna (born 1985) is a Latvian fashion model.  She has modeled for Anna Sui, Balenciaga, Chanel, Chloé, Christian Dior, Dolce & Gabbana, Donna Karan, Dries van Noten, Emilio Pucci, Givenchy, Hermès, Lanvin, Louis Vuitton, Salvatore Ferragamo, Versace, John Galliano, and others.

References

External links
 
 

1985 births
Living people
Latvian female models
Models from Riga